East Main Street Historic District is a national historic district located in Westfield in Chautauqua County, New York.  It is an approximately  district encompassing 20 buildings and the Westfield Cemetery located along East Main Street.  A number of the structures are in the Italianate and Colonial Revival styles. Candlelight Lodge was built in 1851 by a prominent Philadelphia architect as a private home, the property encompassing a good portion of the east half of the Village of Westfield. Candlelight became a lodge in the 1920s and a bed and breakfast in 1986. Candlelight Lodge is a seven bedroom Victorian mansion currently on a two-acre lot in the Village of Westfield. Candlelight also has the Captain Storm House, a Queen Anne Victorian home moved on to this property in 2000 with the assistance of the National Historic Trust and listed on the National Resister of Historic Places.

It was listed on the National Register of Historic Places in 1983.

Gallery

References

Historic districts on the National Register of Historic Places in New York (state)
Colonial Revival architecture in New York (state)
Italianate architecture in New York (state)
Historic districts in Chautauqua County, New York
National Register of Historic Places in Chautauqua County, New York